Larry Niles Manning, Senior (October 4, 1942 – May 23, 2012) was an American stock car racing driver. A native of Salisbury, North Carolina, he was a resident of Richmond, Virginia. Manning competed in the NASCAR Winston Cup Series between 1963 and 1974; he finished eighth in his first race in the series. Following his NASCAR career, he competed in local events at Southside Speedway and South Boston Speedway through 1982.

References

1942 births
2012 deaths
Sportspeople from Richmond, Virginia
Racing drivers from Virginia
NASCAR drivers